The 1912 Harvard Crimson football team was an American football team that represented Harvard University as an independent during the 1912 college football season. In their fifth season under head coach Percy Haughton, the Crimson compiled a perfect 9–0 record, shut out five of nine opponents, and outscored all opponents by a total of 176 to 22. The season was part of an unbeaten streak that began in November 1911 and continued until October 1915.

There was no contemporaneous system in 1912 for determining a national champion. However, Harvard was retroactively named as the national champion by the Billingsley Report, Helms Athletic Foundation, Houlgate System, and Parke H. Davis, and as a co-national champion by the National Championship Foundation.

Percy Wendell as the team captain. Three Harvard players were consensus first-team selections on the 1912 All-American football team: halfback Charles Brickley, guard Stan Pennock, and end Sam Felton. Other notable players included backs Percy Wendell, Huntington Hardwick, and Henry Burchell Gardner, and linemen Bob Storer, Harvey Hitchcock, Derric Choate Parmenter, Gerard Timothy Driscoll, and Francis Joseph O'Brien. Pennock, Wendell, and Hardwick were later inducted into the College Football Hall of Fame.

Schedule

References

Harvard
Harvard Crimson football seasons
College football national champions
College football undefeated seasons
Harvard Crimson football
1910s in Boston